Becerra is a Spanish surname that means 'young cow’, ‘heifer'.  Notable people with the surname include:

 Alberto Becerra (born 1979), former Mexican footballer
 Álvaro Gómez Becerra (1771-1855), Spanish politician
 Ángela Becerra (born 1957), Colombian writer 
 Angelica Becerra (born 1990), Mexican artist 
 Andrea Becerra (born 2000), Mexican archer
 Arnulfo Becerra (born 1962), Venezuelan footballer
 Bailón Becerra (born 1966), Bolivian cyclist
 Beatriz Becerra (born 1966), Spanish politician and writer
 Camilo Becerra, Colombian Olympic freestyle swimmer
 Carlos Becerra, numerous people 
 Carmen Becerra, Mexican actress
 Elson Becerra (1978-2006), Colombian footballer
 Francisco Becerra, Spanish architect
 Gaspar Becerra, Spanish painter and sculptor
 Gustavo Becerra-Schmidt, Chilean composer and musicologist
 Héctor Becerra (born 1965), Mexican football manager and former player
 Heraldo Becerra, Brazilian footballer
 Hugo Becerra Jr. (born 1996), Mexican racecar driver
 Isaac Becerra (born 1988), Spanish footballer
 Ivan Becerra, Mexican footballer
 José Becerra (1936-2016), Mexican boxer
 Juan Camilo Becerra (born 1998), Colombian footballer
 Lourdes Becerra (born 1973), Spanish swimmer
 Lucila Becerra (born 1965), former Mexican tennis player
 Marcos E. Becerra (1870-1940)), Mexican writer and politician
 Manuel Becerra (settler) (1762-c. 1849), Tejano settler and politician in Texas
 María Becerra (born 2000), Argentine singer
 Miguel Becerra (born 1979), Mexican footballer
 Milton Becerra (born 1951), Venezuelan artist
 Nelson Becerra, Peruvian footballer
 Óscar Becerra, Mexican footballer
 Raúl Becerra (born 1987), Argentine-born Chilean footballer
 S. Patricia Becerra, Peruvian biochemist
 Xavier Becerra (born 1958), American politician
 Yolanda Becerra (born 1959), Colombian feminist and pacifist activist